The Hyosung GT125R/Comet is a motorcycle made by Hyosung Motors & Machinery Inc.

Look 

This is a fully faired learner legal sports bike. Its main competition is the Yamaha YZF R125. It has a V Twin 2 cylinder engine & dual carburetor configuration.
However, it has massive weight of  when loaded with fuel, and dry, . This is due to sharing the same frame as the gt250.

The ‘Comet’ version comes without a fairing.

Accessories 

It is very common for owners of this motorbike to tune the carburetor with a 'kit up' that usually costs around €100, and supposedly improves the air/gasoline mix situation at every regime, virtually erasing the engine's well-known lack of torque between 6,500 rpm and 15,000 rpm. This is true however, only for models until the year 2006, after which the engine's design was modified to erase this flaw.  It is notorious that the problem still arises on the new models, but it can be dealt with by a proper tuning of the poppet valve's backlash every .

GT125
Standard motorcycles